Kuzan (also Romanized as Kūzān and Kevzan) is a village in Jirdeh Rural District, in the Central District of Shaft County, Gilan Province, Iran. At the 2006 census, its population was 731, in 182 families.

References 

Populated places in Shaft County